Lake Lagunitas is a reservoir on Lagunitas Creek in Marin County, California.

Nearby lakes
Lake Lagunitas is one of seven reservoirs providing potable water to the Marin Municipal Water District. About a mile east of Lake Lagunitas is Phoenix Lake, with surface area of approximately 25 acres. And 0.3 miles to the west of Lake Lagunitas is Bon Tempe Lake, which has an area of 280 acres. Further to the west of Bon Tempe Lake is Alpine Lake with an area of 224 acres.

The only major lake to the west of Fairfax-Bolinas Road is Kent Lake, the largest in the watershed with surface area of 432 acres.

Lagunitas Dam
The dam was completed in 1872.

See also
List of dams and reservoirs in California
List of lakes in California
List of lakes in the San Francisco Bay Area

References

Lagunitas
Mount Tamalpais
Lagunitas
Laqunitas